Pietro del Donzello (1452–1509) was an Italian painter.

Donzello was born in Florence.  His brother Ippolito was also a painter. Pietro primarily painted traditional scenes and shields. Some of his other works reside at the Cleveland Museum of Art.

References

1452 births
1509 deaths
15th-century Italian painters
Italian male painters
16th-century Italian painters